AllHipHop is a hip hop news website founded by Greg Watkins and Chuck Creekmur in 1998.

History 
The website was founded in 1998 by Greg Watkins and Chuck Creekmur. In 1997, Watkins registered the allhiphop.com domain to promote the artists on Oblique Recordings, a small record label he operated. The website provided music downloads to promote the label's artists. After reaching 30,000 downloads a month, Watkins struck deals with eMusic and other retailers to sell downloads. 

Creekmur, a freelance journalist, had launched a website, tantrum-online.com, in New York City. After merging the companies, they adapted Trantrum's exclamation point logo for AllHipHop. By 2004, the business generated enough revenue for Watkins and Creekmur to work on the website full-time. In 2007, the revenue exceeded US$4 million.

On, August 12, 2017, AllHipHop announced it had partnered with Maven, a company based out of Seattle, to manage their entire digital media platform.

Accolades
In 2006, AllHipHop won the Rising Stars Award from Black Enterprise magazine. 

In 2007, PC Magazine listed it as one of the "Top 100 Undiscovered Web Sites".

Essence magazine dubbed Allhiphop "the CNN of hip-hop" in 2008.

, it attracted over 37 million page views a month.

References

External links 
 

Companies based in New York City
Hip hop websites
Internet properties established in 1998
American music websites